Julong Station is a station of Line 8 of the Guangzhou Metro. It is located underground in the Liwan District and started operation on 26November 2020.

The station has an underground island platform. Platform 1 is for trains towards Jiaoxin, whilst platform 2 is for trains towards Wanshengwei.

Exits
There are 3 exits, lettered A, B and D. Exits A & B are accessible. Exit A is located on Dekang Road, B & D are on Shicha Road.

Gallery

Railway stations in China opened in 2020
Guangzhou Metro stations in Liwan District